Peter Bradford Rouch (born 22 April 1966) is a British Anglican priest who was Archdeacon of Bournemouth between 2011 and 2020. Since May 2021, he has been CEO of the Church Army.

Early life and education
Rouch was born on 22 April 1966 in Rochester, Kent, England. He was educated at Sir Joseph Williamson's Mathematical School, an all-boys grammar school in Rochester. He studied zoology at Brasenose College, Oxford, graduating with a Bachelor of Arts (BA) degree in 1987: as per tradition, his BA was promoted to a Master of Arts (MA Oxon) degree. He worked for Barclays Bank, before training for ordination at Westcott House, Cambridge from 1996 to 1999. While at Westcott, he also studied theology at Peterhouse, Cambridge, graduating with a further BA degree in 1998: as per tradition, his BA was promoted to a Master of Arts (MA Cantab) degree.

Ordained ministry
Rouch was ordained in the Church of England as a deacon in 1999 and as a priest in 2000. He served his curacy at St John the Evangelist, East Dulwich in the Diocese of Southwark from 1999 to 2002. He was on the staff of St Stephen's House, Oxford as a junior research fellow from 2002 to 2004. During this time, he began studying for a Doctor of Philosophy (PhD) degree at the University of Manchester, which he completed in 2005 with a doctoral thesis titled "The Christian doctrine of time in negotiation with contemporary physics ". He was also chaplain to St John's College, Oxford for the 2003/2004 academic year.

Rouch returned to parish ministry and was Priest in charge of Miles Platting in the Diocese of Manchester from 2005 to 2011. This covered two parish's in a deprived are of inner-city Manchester. From 2007 to 2011, he was also an honorary research fellow at the University of Manchester. From 2011 to 2020, he was Archdeacon of Bournemouth in the Diocese of Winchester. He was elected to the General Synod of the Church of England in 2013.

In October 2020, Rouch left Winchester to join the staff at Church House, Westminster, working as principal external consultant for the "Transforming Effectiveness" programme. Since May 2021, he has served as Chief Executive of the Church Army, an evangelistic and mission community of the Church of England.

Personal life
In 1994, Rouch married Tracey. They have two daughters.

References

1966 births
People educated at Sir Joseph Williamson's Mathematical School
People from Rochester, Kent
Alumni of Brasenose College, Oxford
Archdeacons of Bournemouth
Living people
Alumni of Westcott House, Cambridge
Alumni of Peterhouse, Cambridge
Staff of St Stephen's House, Oxford
Alumni of the University of Manchester